The 1994 Arab Junior Athletics Championships was the sixth edition of the international athletics competition for under-20 athletes from Arab countries. It took place in Tunis, Tunisia. Qatar, after a good performance in 1992, did not send a team to the competition. A total of 42 athletics events were contested, 23 for men and 19 for women.

The women's 10,000 metres was restored to the programme after a break in 1992. A women's triple jump was contested for the first time. The men's 20 km road race made its third and final appearance at the championships, as junior road events were largely dropped from international competitions. The men's hurdles finals were only recorded to the tenth of a second due to technical limitations. Wind affected parts of the competition, particularly the 200 metres races and the horizontal jumps.

In line with increased participation, the standard of performers at this event improved. Hadi Soua'an Al-Somaily won a men's hurdles double for Saudi Arabia and won multiple Asian titles as a senior. Ali Hakimi defended his 1500 metres title and added the 800 metres crown; he was an Olympic finalist two years later. Younès Moudrik took the men's long jump title – an event he would win twice at the African Championships in Athletics. Seventeen-year-old Abderrahmane Hammad was runner-up in the high jump but later became the first Arab to win a medal in the high jump at the Olympics.

On the women's side, Fatma Lanouar won the 800 metres in Tunis and was a two-time Mediterranean Games champion as a senior. The runner-up in that event, 16-year-old Hasna Benhassi of Morocco, had even greater success in her career, which included two Olympic and two World Championships medals. Future African champion Aïda Sellam of Tunisia won the javelin throw and a shot put bronze medal on home turf. The winner of the women's walk, Nagwa Ibrahim Ali, would become a prominent athlete in her discipline regionally, with three African titles to her name.

Medal summary

Men

Women

Medal table

References

Arab Junior Athletics Championships
International athletics competitions hosted by Tunisia
Sport in Tunis
Arab Junior Athletics Championships
Arab Junior Athletics Championships
20th century in Tunis
1994 in youth sport